Claviger may refer to:

 Claviger (beetle), a genus of beetles in the family Staphylinidae
 Claviger (title)